Lenka is a singer-songwriter from Australia of Czech descent.

Lenka may also refer to:

 Lenka (given name),  feminine given name
 Lenka (album) the 2008 self-titled album by Lenka
 Lenka, Slovakia, village in Slovakia situated on the border with Hungary
 Lenka (wasp), a wasp genus in the subfamily Pteromalinae

See also 
 Lenca (disambiguation)